Djuka may refer to:

African diaspora
 Djuka, archaic spelling of yuka, Afro-Cuban music genre
 Djuka, archaic spelling of the Ndyuka language of Suriname
 Djuka, archaic spelling of the Ndyuka people of Suriname

Slavic people
Djuka (Đuka) can be a nickname for the given name Đurađ. It can also refer to:

 Đuka Agić (1906–1985), Croatian footballer
 Đuka Galović (1924–2015), Croatian musician
 Đuka Lovrić (1927–1957), Yugoslavian footballer
 Đuka Mandić (1822–1892), mother of inventor Nikola Tesla
 Đuka Begović, 1991 Croatian film
 Đuka, character in the 1975 Yugoslavian film Doktor Mladen
 "Đuka", song by Tatjana Đorđević and Strip
 Uroš Đurđević, nicknamed Đuka
Vladimir Đukanović, nicknamed Đuka